Brian Percy Moll (19 May 1925 – 9 August 2013) was a British-born Australian comedian character actor of stage, television and film and director and producer who emigrated to Australia from his native England in 1950. Quitting his job as a publicity officer, he became a professional actor in 1953. He was best known for his soap opera television roles, but also appeared in film and numerous theatre productions.

Early life 

He was born in Chaucer Road, Wanstead, North East London on 19 May 1925 to Percy Clarence and Alice Sarah (née Mitchell)

During World War II, he was conscripted to the Royal Navy in 1943 at the age of eighteen and spent the later years of World War II serving on a minesweeper. His ship was involved in the D-Day operation and he watched the action from just off the Arromanches beach.
 
In October 1950, he immigrated from England and arrived in Melbourne, Australia under the £10 assisted passage emigration scheme. In December 1975, he took permanent Australian Citizenship.

Career

Theatre 
Moll started taking on leading parts with the Melbourne Little Theatre starting from 1953 and as well as acting he was producing and directing difficult plays by playwrights including as Chekov and Ibsen. In 1963 he moved to Brisbane and he joined the Queensland Arts Theatre. He continued his acting career in his spare time. In the 1960s he was campaigning in Brisbane for a new permanent arts centre and was involved in these plans which resulted in the Arts Complex being built.

In 1970 he was in It's a Rum Do and had the role of Samuel Marsden, the priest who was partly responsible for bringing merino sheep to Australia which started the wool industry. The play was chosen to be given a Royal Command Performance in the Brisbane Arts Centre.  He was presented to the Queen and he told her that over the past two years he had played eight priests. She asked him "Why" and she smiled when he answered "It was my purity of spirit and a bald head". After this, his acting career took off.

Television and film 
Moll was known for his villainous roles, once remarking that this was due to his bald head (he had been completely bald since the age of 25). As a jobbing actor, like many of the era he had numerous character roles on the Crawford Productions TV serials including Matlock Police, Homicide and Division 4, as well as many guest roles on other television series; mini-series, telemovies; and films.

In 1975, he became better known however for playing the recurring role of slimy Town Clerk Eddie Buchanan in soap opera Number 96, Dr. Vincent Snape in The Young Doctors in 1977–1978, and briefly as Mr. Spencer in Prisoner in 1980.
 
He was most likely however best known for his long running itinerant role in serial A Country Practice, as devious and pompous town councillor Alfred Muldoon a role he played as the script permitted from 1982 to 1992, through 120 episodes.

He had a small cameo role in the film Street Fighter in 1994

In 1990, he appeared as Mr. Gordian in Bloodmoon, a horror film.

Later  years and death 
Moll retired in 1994 and resided in Sippy Downs, Queensland in a nursing home, where he died in August 2013, aged 88, His ashes were scattered near his home on the Sunshine Coast.

Filmography

References

External links 

1925 births
2013 deaths
Australian male film actors
Australian male television actors
People from Wanstead
English emigrants to Australia
20th-century Australian male actors
Australian male stage actors